Blok-post imeni Serova is a rural locality (a settlement) in Zaigrayevsky District, Republic of Buryatia, Russia. The population was 52 as of 2010. There are 2 streets.

Geography 
The settlement is located 17 km northwest of Zaigrayevo (the district's administrative centre) by road. Onokhoy is the nearest rural locality.

References 

Rural localities in Zaigrayevsky District